Darren Leicester Cheeseman (born 8 June 1976) is an Australian politician. He has been a Labor Party member of the Victorian Legislative Assembly since November 2018, representing the seat of South Barwon. He previously held the federal seat of Corangamite from 2007 to 2013.

Cheeseman was born in Christchurch, New Zealand.  He grew up in Ballarat and attended Mount Clear College. He later studied for a Bachelor of Applied Science in Geology at the University of Ballarat. He worked for the Association for the Blind, and during that time also served as a councillor for the City of Ballarat. He later worked for the Community and Public Sector Union.

In 2006, Cheeseman contested Labor preselection for Corangamite against the Labor candidate at the 2004 election, former Geelong mayor Peter McMullin. Having secured preselection, he went on to defeat long-time Liberal incumbent Stewart McArthur with a 6.6% swing. McArthur had held the seat since 1984. Cheeseman attributed his win to opposition to WorkChoices, the Liberal government's industrial relations laws. Cheeseman was only the third Labor member ever to win Corangamite, and the first since 1929. He narrowly held Corangamite at the 2010 election, against Liberal candidate Sarah Henderson, becoming the first Labor member to win a second term in the seat.  However, he was defeated by Henderson at the 2013 federal election.

Cheeseman sought Labor preselection for Corangamite in 2015, but was defeated by Surf Coast Shire Councillor Libby Coker.

In 2018, Cheeseman was elected to the Victorian Legislative Assembly as the Labor member for South Barwon.

References

External links

1976 births
Living people
New Zealand emigrants to Australia
People who lost New Zealand citizenship
Naturalised citizens of Australia
Australian Labor Party members of the Parliament of Australia
Australian Labor Party members of the Parliament of Victoria
Members of the Victorian Legislative Assembly
Members of the Australian House of Representatives
Members of the Australian House of Representatives for Corangamite
People from Ballarat
Federation University Australia alumni
People from Christchurch
Australian trade unionists
21st-century Australian politicians
Labor Left politicians